Statistics of Swiss Super League in the 1901–02 season.

East

Central

West

Final

Table

Results 

|colspan="3" style="background-color:#D0D0D0" align=center|6 April 1902

|-
|colspan="3" style="background-color:#D0D0D0" align=center|13 April 1902

|-
|colspan="3" style="background-color:#D0D0D0" align=center|20 April 1902

|}

FC Zürich won the championship.

Sources 
 Switzerland 1901-02 at RSSSF

Seasons in Swiss football
Swiss Football League seasons
1901–02 in Swiss football
Swiss